The teams event of the 2019 BWF World Junior Championships was held from 30 September to 5 October 2019. The event was also known as the 2019 Suhandinata Cup. China was the champion of the last edition held in Markham, Canada, and also 13-time defending champion in this event.

43 countries representing all five continental federations competed in this event. The group draw was done on 8 September. First seed, Indonesia were drawn with Finland and Uganda in group A1. Russia as the host were drawn with Canada, Macau, Hong Kong and Malaysia in group B.

Group stage

Group A

Group A1

Group A2

Group A play-offs

Group B

Group C

Group C1

Group C2

Group C play-offs

Group D

Group E

Group F

Group G

Group H

Group H1

Group H2

Group H play-offs

Final stage

1st to 8th

1st to 8th quarterfinals

5th to 8th semifinals

7th-8th place match

5th-6th place match

1st to 4th semifinals

Final

9th to 16th

17th to 24th

25th to 32nd

33rd to 40th

41st to 43rd

Final standings

References

External links
 Tournament draw

Teams
World Junior